Proskurinskaya is a rural locality (a village) in Vyatkinskoye Rural Settlement, Sudogodsky District, Vladimir Oblast, Russia. The population was 6 as of 2010.

Geography 
Proskurinskaya is located 36 km northwest of Sudogda (the district's administrative centre) by road. Pavlovskaya is the nearest rural locality.

References 

Rural localities in Sudogodsky District